Cha Kwi-hyun (born 12 January 1975) is a football player from South Korea.

He was a member of the South Korean youth (U-20) team in early 1990s and went on to play as a professional in the K-League.

Club history
Daejeon Citizen (1997–1998)
Chunnam Dragons (1999)

See also
List of South Korean footballers
Sport in South Korea
List of Koreans

External links
 

South Korean footballers
Daejeon Hana Citizen FC players
Jeonnam Dragons players
Year of birth missing (living people)
Living people
Association football forwards